(born 9 February 1981) is a Japanese entertainer, former singer, and musical theater actress. She is affiliated with Rising Production.

History
Rina Chinen took lessons as a child from the Okinawa Actors School. By the time she reached junior high, she relocated to Osaka due to her father's work, but she continued to take lessons at the Okinawa Actors School during the weekend. Chinen moved to Tokyo shortly after graduating from high school.

Music career
In October 1996, Chinen made her music debut with the single "Do-Do for Me". A year later, her second single "Precious Delicious" earned her the Best New Artist Award at the 39th Japan Record Awards, with her third single, "Pinch ~Love Me Deeper~", being used as the third and final ending theme for the anime series, Kodomo no Omocha that same year. In 1998, her fifth single "Wing" peaked at No. 5 on Oricon's singles chart, becoming her biggest hit.

On 15 July 2001, Chinen performed at the Music Fest Peace of Ryukyu, a music festival featuring Okinawan artists. As her pop music activity decreased, she pursued a career in musical acting in 2003.

On 21 October 2021, Sony Music Entertainment Japan released all 81 of Chinen's songs internationally on digital streaming platforms to commemorate the 25th anniversary of her debut.

Acting career

Television
In July 1996, Chinen made her acting debut in the drama series . In 2002, Chinen appeared in the drama series .

On 29 July 2020, Chinen was announced as part of the cast of the Toei tokusatsu drama Kamen Rider Saber.

Musical theatre
Chinen made her musical theatre debut in the Tokyo production of Jekyll & Hyde in December 2003. A year later, she starred in the localized adaptations of Miss Saigon and Fiddler on the Roof. In 2005, Chinen appeared in the Tokyo production of Les Misérables. She has since taken multiple roles for Miss Saigon and Les Misérables until 2022. Chinen is scheduled to play Winifred Banks in the Japanese stage production of Mary Poppins in 2022.

Personal life
On 10 August 2005, Chinen at the age of 24 registered her marriage to model Kentaro Nakamura, aged 22. The couple were expecting a child at the time she was cast in Jekyll & Hyde; her part was consequently reassigned to Ranran Suzuki. Chinen announced she planned on taking maternity leave after the drama finished its season, and would continue working after becoming a mother. Chinen gave birth to a baby boy on 11 March 2006. Chinen and Nakamura divorced on 15 March 2007. Nakamura was arrested on drug charges in June of that year.

Chinen married actor Yoshio Inoue on 27 July 2016. She gave birth to her second boy on 12 June 2018.

On 9 December 2019, Chinen announced that she had passed the high school graduation certification exam.

Discography

Singles

Studio albums

Compilation albums

Videography

Filmography

TV
Gakkō no Kaidan R (Kansai TV, 1996) – Kazuko Miyata
Shin-D – "Love Blood" (Kansai TV, 1997)
Five (NTV, 1997) – Madoka
Yume no California (TBS, 2002)
Kochira Hon Ikegami Sho (TBS, 2002—2005) – Atsuko Shindō
Asami Mitsuhiko Series 19: Yuta ga Aishita Tantei (Fuji TV, 2004) – Kaori
Kyoto Chiken no Onna (TV Asahi, 2010) – Kumi Sekimoto
SP ~ Keishichō Keigo-ka (TV Asahi, 2012) – Yuri Sudō
First Class (Fuji TV, 2014) – Madoka Ōkubo
Lunch Detective ~ Koi to Gourmet to Nazotoki to ~ (YTV, 2020) – Ritsuko Shiraishi
Kamen Rider Saber (TV Asahi, 2020) – Sophia

TV animation
Star Twinkle PreCure (2019) – Mary Anne

Film
Seishun Mandala! (2010) – Miki
Saber + Zenkaiger: Superhero Senki (2021) - Sophia

Film animation
 Doraemon: Nobita and the Winged Braves (2001) – Tsubakuro
 Star Twinkle PreCure the Movie: These Feelings Within the Song of Stars (2019) – Mary Anne

Dubbing
The Star (2017) – Mary

Musicals
 Jekyll & Hyde – Emma Carew (December 2003)
 Miss Saigon – Kim (2004–2014), Ellen (2016–2022)
 Fiddler on the Roof – Hodel (2004)
 Les Misérables – Cosette (2005), Éponine (2007–2009), Fantine (2011–2021)
 Rudolf – Princess Stephanie of Belgium (2008)
 Dance of the Vampires – Sarah (2009–2011)
 She Loves Me – Ilona Ritter (2009)
 Oh! Tabaruzaka – Fujimaki (2010)
 Himeyuri – Kimi (2010)
 SHOW-ismIV TATTOO 14 – Guest Sky (2013)
 Ludwig B – Eleanore von Breuning (2014)
 Radiant Baby – Amanda (2016)
 Mary Poppins – Winfred Banks (2022)

References

External links
 
 Official profile at Rising Production
 
 Rina Actress Profile – jdorama.com

1981 births
Living people
Japanese women pop singers
Japanese idols
Japanese women singer-songwriters
Japanese musical theatre actresses
Musicians from Okinawa Prefecture
People from Naha
Japanese Christians
Sony Music Entertainment Japan artists
20th-century Japanese women singers
20th-century Japanese singers
21st-century Japanese women singers
21st-century Japanese singers